Guariba River is a river of the Mato Grosso and Amazonas states in north-western Brazil. It is a tributary of the Aripuanã River.

Course

In Mato Grosso the river forms the eastern boundary of the northern half of the  Guariba-Roosevelt Extractive Reserve, a sustainable use unit created in 1996.
It then crosses the border into Amazonas, where it runs through the  Guariba Extractive Reserve, created in 2005.
Further north it meets the Aripuanã in the region between the Campos Amazônicos and Juruena national parks.

See also
List of rivers of Amazonas

References

Sources

Rivers of Amazonas (Brazilian state)